Nelson Rattenbury (27 October 1907 – 27 May 1973) was a Liberal party member of the Senate of Canada. He was born in Charlottetown, Prince Edward Island and became a business executive.

The son of John Morton Rattenbury and Jessie Margaret Henderson, he was educated in Charlottetown and became a manufacturer in Saint John, New Brunswick. Rattenbury was president of Northern Roofing and Metal Workers Ltd. Industrial Insulators Ltd. and D.A. Cummings Ltd. In 1963, he married Phyllis Jane Blakeney.

He was appointed to the Senate for the Saint John, New Brunswick division on 14 February 1964 as nominated by Prime Minister Lester B. Pearson. Rattenbury remained in that role until his death on 27 May 1973.

References

External links
 

1907 births
1973 deaths
Businesspeople from Prince Edward Island
Businesspeople from Saint John, New Brunswick
Canadian senators from New Brunswick
Liberal Party of Canada senators
People from Charlottetown